John Jefferson Wolcott (June 20, 1810 Trenton, Oneida County, New York – July 31, 1881 Fulton, Oswego County) was an American merchant, banker and politician from New York.

Life
He was the son of Samuel Wolcott (c. 1775 – 1857). In 1831, he became a merchant. In 1834, he removed to Fulton. On September 10, 1835, he married Sarah Ann Fox (1814–1888). He was President of the Oswego River Bank, and later the First National Bank of Fulton.

Wolcott entered politics as a Democrat, sided with the Barnburners, joined the Free Soil Party in 1848, then became a Soft-Shell Democrat, and finally joined the Republican Party upon its foundation.

He was Chairman of the Board of Supervisors of Oswego County in 1854; President of the Village of Fulton for two terms; a member of the New York State Assembly (Oswego Co., 2nd D.) in 1858; and a member of the New York State Senate (21st D.) in 1866 and 1867.

Sources
The New York Civil List compiled by Franklin Benjamin Hough, Stephen C. Hutchins and Edgar Albert Werner (1870; pg. 444)
Life Sketches of the State Officers, Senators, and Members of the Assembly of the State of New York, in 1867 by S. R. Harlow & H. H. Boone (pg. 168ff)
Fox-Wolcott marriage at Family Tree Maker

1810 births
1881 deaths
Republican Party New York (state) state senators
People from Trenton, New York
People from Fulton, Oswego County, New York
Republican Party members of the New York State Assembly
Town supervisors in New York (state)
19th-century American politicians